Aaron Lopez (1731–1782), born Duarte Lopez, was a merchant, slave trader, and philanthropist in colonial Rhode Island. Through his varied commercial ventures, he became the wealthiest person in Newport, Rhode Island. In 1761 and 1762, Lopez unsuccessfully sued the Rhode Island colonial government for citizenship.

Early life
Duarte Lopez was born in 1731 in Lisbon, Portugal. He belonged to a family of conversos, Portuguese Jews who had converted to Catholicism, although the family continued to practice Judaism in secret. In 1750 Lopez married a woman named Anna, and within two years she gave birth to a daughter, Catherine.  Anna died on May 14, 1762 at age 36.  In the summer of 1763, Lopez took Sarah Rivera, the New York born daughter of Jacob Rodriguez Rivera, for a wife.  Sarah, 16 years Aaron's junior, would bear him 10 children.

Aaron's older brother José had left Portugal years earlier, began to openly practise Judaism, and changed his given name to Moses. Moses was naturalized in 1740 and granted a license by the General Assembly to make potash in 1753, and he became a successful merchant in Newport. In 1752 Duarte and his family moved to Newport, where they too reclaimed their  Jewish identities and became Aaron, Abigail, and Sarah.

Merchant and slave trader 

Lopez established himself as a shopkeeper in Newport shortly after his arrival. By 1755 he was buying and selling goods throughout Rhode Island and dealing with agents in Boston and New York. One of Lopez's early business interests was the trade in spermaceti, a coveted wax extracted from whale oil used to make elegant candles. Lopez built a candle-making factory in Newport in 1756. By 1760, a dozen competitors had built similar plants in New England. Whalers couldn't supply the factories with enough spermaceti to meet the demand, and the price of whale oil was climbing. In 1761, Lopez joined eight other merchants to form a trust to control the cost and distribution of whale oil.

Lopez expanded his trade beyond the North American coastline and by 1757 had major interests in the West Indian trade. He also sent ships to Europe and the Canary Islands. Between 1761 and 1774, Lopez was involved in the slave trade. Historian Eli Faber determined Lopez underwrote 21 slave ships during a period in which Newport sent a total of 347 slave ships to Africa. By the beginning of the American Revolution, Lopez owned or controlled 30 vessels, engaged in the European and West Indian trade and in whale fisheries.

By the early 1770s, Lopez had become the wealthiest person in Newport; his tax assessment was twice that of any other resident. The reason he was successful was that his business interests were so diverse. He manufactured spermaceti candles, ships, barrels, rum, and chocolate. He had business interests in the production of textiles, clothes, shoes, hats, and bottles. Ezra Stiles, the Congregational minister in Newport and future president of Yale College, described Lopez as "a merchant of the first eminence" and wrote that the "extent of [his] commerce probably [was] surpassed by no merchant in America".

In the mid-1770s, with growing tensions between Britain and its North American colonies, Lopez's fortunes began to decline. The Continental Association enforced a boycott against trade with Britain. In October 1775, a Royal Navy force anchored outside Newport's harbour and the population began to evacuate the city. In early 1776 Lopez relocated to Portsmouth, Rhode Island, then to Providence, Boston, and finally to Leicester, Massachusetts. Historian Marilyn Kaplan describes Lopez's losses during the American Revolution as "monumental."

Philanthropy
Lopez supported a number of charitable causes in Newport. He purchased books for the Redwood Library and Athenaeum. He contributed lumber to help build the College in the English Colony of Rhode Island and Providence Plantations (which later relocated to Providence and eventually became Brown University), and he donated land to establish Leicester Academy in Leicester, Massachusetts.
It has been said about him that he was 'a man of eminent probity and benevolence whose bounties were widely diffused, not confined to creed or sect.'

Lopez was a leading contributor who helped build the Touro Synagogue, and he was given the honor of laying one of its cornerstones.

During the American Revolution, Lopez harbored Jewish refugees in his Leicester home. Referring to those sheltered by Lopez, a friend wrote in jest that "your family at present are in a number only 99 and still there is room for one more".

Citizenship
In 1761, Lopez applied to the Rhode Island Superior Court to become a naturalized citizen. Under the Naturalization Act of 1740, any foreign Protestant who had resided in Britain's American colonies for seven years could become a British subject; while Catholics were excluded by the law, special provisions were allowed for the religious scruples of both Quakers and Jews. Although he met the conditions set by law, Lopez's request was denied by the colonial government of Rhode Island. Another qualified Jew, Isaac Elizer, was also denied citizenship.

Lopez and Elizer appealed to the Rhode Island General Assembly. The lower house approved their request and required that the men return to the Superior Court to take an oath of allegiance, but the terms of their citizenship would be limited: Jews could become citizens of Rhode Island, but they would not be allowed to vote or serve in public office.

Lopez and Elizer fared worse in the upper house of the legislature. There they were told that the British Parliament had given the courts, not the legislature, jurisdiction over naturalization. If they wished to become citizens, Lopez and Elizer would have to appeal to the Superior Court.

The Superior Court heard the pair's appeal on March 11, 1762. Their application was denied a second time. The court reasoned that the 1740 act was intended to increase the population of the colony, and since the colony had grown crowded the law no longer applied. The court also noted that under a 1663 Rhode Island law, only Christians could become citizens. Lopez and Elizer could not become citizens of Rhode Island.

Determined to become a citizen, Lopez made inquiries to learn whether he could become naturalized in another colony. In April 1762 he moved temporarily to Swansea, Massachusetts. On October 15, 1762, Lopez became a citizen of Massachusetts and then returned to Newport. Historians believe Lopez was the first Jew to become a naturalized citizen of Massachusetts.

Death
On May 28, 1782, while returning with his family from Leicester to Newport, he drowned when his horse and carriage fell into a pond. He was buried in the Jewish cemetery in Newport.

See also

 History of the Jews in Colonial America
 Jewish views on slavery

References

Sources

Further reading

External links

1731 births
1782 deaths
Jews and Judaism in Rhode Island
Jewish-American history
People from Lisbon
18th-century Sephardi Jews
Brown University people
Portuguese emigrants to the Thirteen Colonies
American people of Portuguese-Jewish descent
American Sephardic Jews
American businesspeople
American slave traders
Jewish-American slave owners
People of colonial Rhode Island
18th-century Portuguese businesspeople
Deaths by drowning in the United States
Accidental deaths in Rhode Island
Burials in Rhode Island
Portuguese slave owners